The men's 52 kg weightlifting event was the lightest event at the weightlifting competition of the 1988 Summer Olympics, limiting competitors to a maximum of 52 kilograms of body mass. The competition took place on 18 September, and participants were divided in two groups. Each lifter performed in both the snatch and clean and jerk lifts, with the final score being the sum of the lifter's best result in each. The athlete received three attempts in each of the two lifts; the score for the lift was the heaviest weight successfully lifted.

Results

References

Sources

Weightlifting at the 1988 Summer Olympics